Gnagna is one of the 45 provinces of Burkina Faso, and is in Est Region. The capital of Gnagna is Bogandé. 
The population of Gnagna in 2019 was 675,897.

Subdivision
Gnagna is divided into 7 departments:

References

See also
Regions of Burkina Faso
Provinces of Burkina Faso
Departments of Burkina Faso

 
Provinces of Burkina Faso